Paradraga is a genus of flies in the family Stratiomyidae.

Distribution
Papua New Guinea.

Species
Paradraga omnihirta James, 1980

References

Stratiomyidae
Brachycera genera
Diptera of Australasia
Endemic fauna of Papua New Guinea